Malmö FF competed in Division 2 Sydsvenska Serien for the 1926–27 season.

Players

Squad stats

|}

Club

Other information

References
 

Malmö FF seasons
Association football clubs 1926–27 season